Circocylliba is a genus of mites in the order Mesostigmata, placed in its own family, Circocyllibamidae.

Species
 Circocylliba camerata Sellnick, 1926
 Circocylliba dulcius Elzinga, 1994
 Circocylliba esenbecki Elzinga, 1994

References

Mesostigmata